Jean Said Makdisi (born 1940) is a Palestinian writer and independent scholar, best known for her autobiographical writing.

Life
Jean Said Makdisi was born in Jerusalem to a Palestinian family. The younger sister of Rosemarie Said Zahlan and Edward Said, she was raised in Egypt and educated in the United States and England.<ref>Makdisi, Jean Said 1940–, Contemporary Authors, encyclopedia.com. Accessed February 11, 2020.</ref> She married a Lebanese academic of Palestinian origin, Samir Makdisi. They lived in America before moving to Beirut in 1972, where she taught English and Humanities at the Beirut University College. They remained in Beirut throughout the Lebanese Civil War and the 1982 Israeli invasion. Makdisi documented the city's decline in her first book, Beirut Fragments: a war memoir (1989):

In Teta, mother, and me (2005) Makdisi brought alive a century of Arab life though the story of three generations of Arab women: herself, her mother, Hilda Musa Said, and her grandmother, Munira Badr Musa.

Her son is the literary critic Saree Makdisi.

Works
 Beirut fragments: a war memoir. New York: Persea Books, 1989
 Teta, mother, and me: an Arab woman's memoir.  	London : Saqi, 2005
 (ed. with Martin Asser) My life in the PLO: the inside story of the Palestinian struggle by Shafiq al-Hout. Translated by Hader al-Hout and Laila Othman. London: Pluto Press, 2010
 (ed. with Noha Bayoumi and Rafif Rida Sidawi) Arab feminisms: gender and equality in the Middle East''. London: I.B. Tauris, 2013

References

1940 births
Living people
Palestinian writers
Palestinian women writers
People from Jerusalem
Academic staff of Lebanese American University
Palestinian expatriates in Egypt
Palestinian expatriates in the United States
Palestinian expatriates in the United Kingdom
Palestinian expatriates in Lebanon
Said family